Wolfenden may refer to any of the following:

People 
 Wolfenden (surname)

Places 
 Wolfenden, location and township near Newchurch-in-Rossendale, Lancashire
 Mount Wolfenden, Vancouver